The 22831 / 32 Howrah Junction–Sathya Sai Prasanthi Nilayam Express is a Superfast express train belonging to Indian Railways East Coast Zone that runs between  and  in India.

It operates as train number 22831 from Howrah Junction to Sathya Sai Prasanthi Nilayam and as train number 22832 in the reverse direction, serving the states of  West Bengal, Odisha & Andhra Pradesh.

Coaches
The 22831 / 32 Howrah Junction–Sathya Sai Prasanthi Nilayam Express has one AC 2-tier, two AC 3-tier, eight sleeper class, six general unreserved & two SLR (seating with luggage rake) coaches . It does not carry a pantry car.

As is customary with most train services in India, coach composition may be amended at the discretion of Indian Railways depending on demand.

Service

As the average speed of the train is above , as per railway rules, its fare includes a Superfast surcharge.

Schedule

22832 – leaves Sathya Sai Prasanthi Nilayam every Friday and reaches Howrah Saturday at 2:50 PM IST

22831 – leaves Howrah every Wednesday at 3:35 PM and reaches Sathya Sai Prasanthi Nilayam on Thursday at 10:25 PM IST

Routing

Traction

Rake composition

 1 AC II Tier
 2 AC III Tier
 8 Sleeper coaches
 6 General
 1 SE I
 2 Second-class Luggage/parcel van
 2 GRD

References

External links
22831 Howrah Junction–Sathya Sai Prasanthi Nilayam Express at India Rail Info
22832 Sathya Sai Prasanthi Nilayam–Howrah Junction Express at India Rail Info

Rail transport in Howrah
Express trains in India
Rail transport in West Bengal
Rail transport in Odisha
Rail transport in Andhra Pradesh
Railway services introduced in 2011